Jermaine Mays (born July 13, 1979) is a former professional American and Canadian football cornerback. He was signed as an undrafted free agent by the Minnesota Vikings in 2003. He played college football for the Minnesota Golden Gophers.

Mays has also been a member of the Indianapolis Colts, Orlando Predators, Nashville Kats and Hamilton Tiger-Cats.

Early years
Mays was born in Miami, Florida on July 13, 1979 and he grew up there. He attended Miami Jackson High School where he was an All-State selection in his senior year despite breaking his collarbone.

College career
Mays attended the University of Minnesota and played football at the wide receiver position for the Golden Gophers in 2001 and 2002. He majored in Youth Studies & Leadership while at Minnesota.

After getting redshirted in 2000, Mays saw limited action in 2001. He recorded 21 receptions and 381 yards. He also scored an 81-yard touchdown which proved to be a game winner against Iowa.

In 2002, Mays won the team MVP award after playing on special teams and setting a school record with five blocked punts in one season.

Professional career

Minnesota Vikings
Mays was signed as an undrafted free agent by the Minnesota Vikings on September 10, 2003 as a wide receiver. On August 5, 2003, Mays switched to cornerback.

Mays was assigned by the Vikings to the Berlin Thunder in 2004. He helped lead the Thunder to a World Bowl. The Vikings released him on September 6, 2004.

Indianapolis Colts
Mays was signed by the Indianapolis Colts on February 11, 2005 and was assigned to the Berlin Thunder. He recorded 22 tackles, and scored a touchdown for 100 yards which is the league record. He was released by the Colts on September 4, 2005.

Orlando Predators
The Orlando Predators signed Mays on October 12, 2005, but did not play in any games for the Predators that season.

In 2006, he started the first four games for the Predators before he pulled his hamstring and was traded.

Nashville Kats
Mays was traded to the Nashville Kats for future Toronto Argonauts teammate defensive back Khalil Carter on March 15, 2006. He recorded 74 tackles, two interceptions one of which he returned for a touchdown during his rookie year. At the end of the season, he was named the AFL Rookie of the Year.

First stint with Argonauts
Mays was signed by the Toronto Argonauts on May 12, 2006. He played in eight games for the Argonauts, seven of which he started. Made his CFL debut against the Hamilton Tiger-Cats and recorded his first interception in the CFL in the same game, picking off Jason Maas.

In 2007, he dressed for four games with the Argonauts, but was released on August 18, 2007.

Hamilton Tiger-Cats
On March 7, 2008, Mays was signed by the Hamilton Tiger-Cats. However, after not playing a game for the Tiger-Cats, he was released on July 29, 2008.

Second stint with Argonauts
The Argonauts re-signed Mays on October 15, 2008. He was released on May 29, 2009.

Personal

References

1979 births
Living people
Players of American football from Minneapolis
Sportspeople from Minneapolis
American players of Canadian football
American football wide receivers
American football defensive backs
Canadian football defensive backs
Minnesota Golden Gophers football players
Minnesota Vikings players
Berlin Thunder players
Indianapolis Colts players
Orlando Predators players
Nashville Kats players
Toronto Argonauts players
Hamilton Tiger-Cats players
Players of Canadian football from Minnesota